Jack Heighton (born 26 February 1999) is a New Zealand rugby union player, currently playing for the Rugby New York (Ironworkers) in Major League Rugby (MLR) and  in the National Provincial Championship. His preferred position is fly-half or Fullback.

Professional career
Heighton signed for Major League Rugby side Rugby New York for the 2022 Major League Rugby season. He was also named in the  squad for the 2020 Super Rugby season, although he did not make an appearance.

References

External links
itsrugby.co.uk Profile

1999 births
Living people
Rugby union fly-halves
Rugby union fullbacks
New Zealand rugby union players
Blues (Super Rugby) players
North Harbour rugby union players
Rugby New York players